Jetsam is any cargo that is intentionally discarded from a ship or wreckage.

Jetsam may also refer to:
 Jetsam Moraine, in Antarctica
 Jetsam (film), a 2007 British  thriller
 "Jetsam" (short story), a short story by Kerry Greenwood
 Mr. Jetsam or Malcolm McEachern, part of the Australian musical comedy duo Mr. Flotsam and Mr. Jetsam

See also
 Flotsam and Jetsam (disambiguation)